Paraphellia is a genus of cnidarians belonging to the family Hormathiidae.

The species of this genus are found in Western Europe, Northern Africa, Malesia.

Species:

Paraphellia expansa 
Paraphellia hunti 
Paraphellia lineata 
Paraphellia sanzoi

References

Hormathiidae
Hexacorallia genera